The Shwemawdaw Pagoda is a stupa located in Bago, Myanmar. It is often referred to as the Golden God Temple. At  in height, the Shwemadaw holds the record for the tallest pagoda in the country although the Shwedagon Pagoda in Yangon is usually credited as the tallest pagoda in Myanmar (at ). Shwemadaw, along with the Shwedagon and Kyaiktiyo, are famous Mon pagodas. The annual pagoda festival is a 10-day affair that takes place during the Burmese month of Tagu.

History
The Shwemawdaw Paya was originally built around the 10th century, C.E. It was destroyed several times due to earthquakes, including one in 1917 and another in 1930. Portions of the fallen pre-1917 version of the Paya remain at the site. Allegedly, the hairs were given personally to two Mon merchants named Mahasala and Kullasala by the Buddha on a trip to India. Tooth relics were also added to the pagoda in 982 and 1385. Further additions to the temple include a bell from King Dhammazedi, a crown from King Bayinnaung, and a spire umbrella from King Bodawpaya. The current stupa, as of its most recent rebuilding, stands at 374 feet, making it the tallest in Myanmar.

Images

See also
 List of tallest structures built before the 20th century

References

Exploring the Shwemawdaw Pagoda

External links
 

Pagodas in Myanmar
10th-century Buddhist temples
Buddhist pilgrimage sites in Myanmar